Sophia Flörsch (born 1 December 2000) is a German racing driver who currently competes in FIA Formula 3 with PHM Racing by Charouz. She has previously raced in the DTM, the FIA World Endurance Championship and is a podium finisher in ADAC Formula 4 and the ELMS, as well as the youngest race winner of the Ginetta Junior Championship. In February 2023, she joined the Alpine Academy.

Personal life
Flörsch was born in Grünwald, Bavaria, and has spent most of her life around Munich: she attended Oberhaching Grammar School and is now based in Pullach. Her interests include karting, skiing and wind surfing.

In February 2020 she won the award for World Comeback of the Year at the 2020 Laureus World Sports Awards.

Controversy
Flörsch is an outspoken critic of the W Series women's Formula 3 championship; labelling it a "step back on a sporting level" and "not the way to help women in motorsport" upon launch in 2019, and "gender bashing" in 2022. She further criticised the existence of a series-affiliated esports championship held during the coronavirus pandemic since she claimed it would create "segregation behind a computer".

Upon entering the FIA Formula 3 Championship in 2020, Flörsch criticised the German media, claiming that they were favouring Mick and David Schumacher due to their fathers' (Michael and Ralf respectively) successes and refusing to promote other German junior formula drivers.

Racing career

Karting
Flörsch began karting in 2005. From 2008 to 2014, Flörsch competed in various karting events across Europe through Kart Sport. She became the first female driver and also youngest driver of three series she competed in, the 2008 SAKC Championship, 2009 ADAC German Championship and 2010 European Championship Easykart. She was also scouted by Red Bull.

Ginetta Junior
In 2015, Flörsch took part in the 2015 Ginetta Junior Championship season driving for HHC Motorsport. During the season, Flörsch collected two wins and a further two podiums. She made double Ginetta history at Thruxton by becoming the youngest driver to win a Ginetta Junior race, and also the first rookie to win two out of two races in one weekend. Her season was cut short due to financial issues and she finished at the mid-season point, at that time running in third in the championship, also leading the Rookie championship. Her car for the season was Car 14, which she named Paul.

Formula 4
In 2016, Flörsch signed with Motopark to drive in the ADAC Formula 4 championship. Her car for the season was Car #99, which she called Hugo. In her debut race, she became the first female to score points in an ADAC Formula 4 race. She almost achieved her first podium in her third race; after being hit by another car in the closing laps of the race she recovered to fifth. Her first fastest lap of the season came at race 3 in Zandvoort, in a race halted by poor weather conditions.

The following year she raced for BWT Mücke Motorsport, scoring two podiums and two fastest laps.

FIA Formula 3 European Championship

2018
On 13 March 2018, Flörsch participated in her first FIA Formula 3 European Championship test, driving a Van Amersfoort Racing car. On 6 July 2018, it was announced that she would join Van Amersfoort Racing beginning with the round at Circuit Zandvoort a week later. She finished 22nd in the standings, her sole point coming at the Red Bull Ring.

2018 Macau Grand Prix
From 15 to 18 November 2018, Flörsch participated in the Formula 3 World Cup at the 2018 Macau Grand Prix. During the main race, on Lap 4, she made contact with fellow driver Jehan Daruvala, who was reportedly slowing for erroneously-displayed yellow flags on the straight between Mandarin Corner (Turn 2) and Lisboa Bend (Turn 3). This caused a front left suspension failure, catapulting her car into Lisboa Bend sideways at high speed, launching off Sho Tsuboi's car, through the catch-fencing and smashing into a photographers' bunker, before landing back onto the wheels. Flörsch was reported as conscious post-crash and was hospitalised along with Tsuboi, two photographers and a marshal. She was later diagnosed with a spinal fracture, for which she underwent a surgery lasting almost 10 hours the following day, subsequently reported as successful with “no fear of paralysis”, by her race team leader, Frits van Amersfoort.

Formula Regional

On 14 December 2018, Van Amersfoort Racing confirmed that Flörsch would race for the team in the European F3 replacement series, Formula European Masters, in 2019. After this series folded before a round was contested, Flörsch and VAR switched to the Formula Regional European Championship for updated Formula 3 machinery. Having joined the championship only one week before the opening race, the team struggled throughout the entire season, and Flörsch could only manage 7th place in the drivers' standings.

Formula 3

2019 Macau Grand Prix 
Flörsch was selected by the HWA Team to attend the FIA Formula 3 Championship post-season test on 22 October 2019 in Valencia. In early November, it was confirmed that Flörsch was placed on the team to compete in the 2019 Macau Grand Prix, with support from several Macanese companies and notable people. She failed to finish the race after her car suffered a mechanical failure which left her stranded ahead of the Mandarin Oriental Bend on the eighth lap.

2020 
Flörsch signed with Campos Racing for the 2020 season of the FIA F3 Championship to partner Alessio Deledda and Alex Peroni. After a difficult year with several mechanical problems, she finished 29th out of 35 drivers in the standings, with a best finish of 12th. She was the first woman to race in the championship since its formation after the GP3 Series and European F3 categories were merged.

2023 
Flörsch returned to the FIA Formula 3 Championship in 2023, signing with PHM Racing by Charouz. Shortly after, she was announced as a new member of the Alpine Academy, having been selected by the brand's new 'Rac(H)er' programme.

Endurance racing

Flörsch combined her 2020 FIA Formula 3 Championship commitments with a debut in prototype racing, skipping the Spa-Francorchamps Formula 3 round to enter the Le Castellet 240 with Beitske Visser for Richard Mille Racing Team in the LMP2 class of the 2020 European Le Mans Series instead. The campaign also included entry into the 2020 24 Hours of Le Mans, where she finished in 9th place alongside Visser and Tatiana Calderón.

She continued with Richard Mille in 2021, this time in the FIA World Endurance Championship, where she led the team to five points finishes and qualified a season-best 6th at the 8 Hours of Bahrain, ahead of Formula One race winner Juan Pablo Montoya. She also received a call-up from Algarve Pro Racing to replace Diego Menchaca in the 2021 European Le Mans Series season finale at Portimão. She finished third alongside Ferdinand Habsburg and Richard Bradley, achieving the team's first podium and becoming the first woman to ever finish on an overall podium in the series. Flörsch later appeared in the post-season FIA World Endurance Championship rookie test in Bahrain, driving for newly-crowned LMP2 champions Team WRT, where she led both sessions.

In 2022, Flörsch left the Richard Mille project to join G-Drive Racing and make a full-time return to the European Le Mans Series, driving one of the team's two Oreca 07 LMP2 cars alongside Roman Rusinov. The plan quickly changed following the team's withdrawal due to the Russian invasion of Ukraine. Algarve Pro Racing, who were set to run G-Drive's cars, took over independently, signing Flörsch and F2 podium finisher Bent Viscaal. Despite both being silver-rated and lacking experience compared to the rival three-driver lineups, the pair took second place on debut at Paul Ricard. That was to be the high point of their season though, as a late puncture at Imola, an untimely full-course yellow at Monza and a pit-lane start at Barcelona limited their next results, before Flörsch vacated her seat for the final two rounds. She also entered the 24 Hours of Le Mans alongside Jack Aitken and bronze-rated John Falb, where bad fortune struck too. As the cars lined up for the start of the race, Flörsch's car came to a stop at the start-finish line with a sensor issue. She managed to restart it and crawl back to the pits, but the trio lost five laps and all podium aspirations while the crew fixed the problem. They ended up charging back up to fifth place in the LMP2 Pro/Am subclass, as Aitken set the 8th fastest LMP2 time and Flörsch was the 3rd quickest silver driver.

DTM
Alongside her FIA WEC programme, Flörsch raced in the 2021 Deutsche Tourenwagen Masters for German team Abt Sportsline with backing from Schaeffler. She competed in 14 out of 16 races, and scored 8 points.

Racing record

Career summary

† As Flörsch had not competed in the required number of rounds she was ineligible for a championship position.

Complete Ginetta Junior Championship results
(key) (Races in bold indicate pole position) (Races in italics indicate fastest lap)

Complete ADAC Formula 4 Championship results
(key) (Races in bold indicate pole position) (Races in italics indicate fastest lap)

Complete FIA Formula 3 European Championship results
(key) (Races in bold indicate pole position) (Races in italics indicate fastest lap)

Complete Macau Grand Prix results

Complete Formula Regional European Championship results
(key) (Races in bold indicate pole position) (Races in italics indicate fastest lap)

* The third race in Vallelunga was cancelled due to bad weather and later run in Imola as a fourth race.

Complete FIA Formula 3 Championship results
(key) (Races in bold indicate pole position; races in italics indicate points for the fastest lap of top ten finishers)

Complete European Le Mans Series results
(key) (Races in bold indicate pole position; results in italics indicate fastest lap)

Complete 24 Hours of Le Mans results

Complete FIA World Endurance Championship results
(key) (Races in bold indicate pole position) (Races in italics indicate fastest lap)

Complete Deutsche Tourenwagen Masters results 
(key) (Races in bold indicate pole position) (Races in italics indicate fastest lap)

References

External links

Profile on Motorsportal.com 

2000 births
Living people
Sportspeople from Munich
German racing drivers
German female racing drivers
Ginetta Junior Championship drivers
ADAC Formula 4 drivers
Italian F4 Championship drivers
FIA Formula 3 European Championship drivers
Laureus World Sports Awards winners
FIA Formula 3 Championship drivers
24 Hours of Le Mans drivers
Formula Regional European Championship drivers
Deutsche Tourenwagen Masters drivers
European Le Mans Series drivers
FIA World Endurance Championship drivers
Motopark Academy drivers
Mücke Motorsport drivers
Van Amersfoort Racing drivers
HWA Team drivers
Campos Racing drivers
Abt Sportsline drivers
Signature Team drivers
PHM Racing drivers
Charouz Racing System drivers